is the railway station in Shisa-cho Ura-men, Matsuura, Nagasaki Prefecture.It is operated by Matsuura Railway and is on the Nishi-Kyūshū Line.

Lines
Matsuura Railway
Nishi-Kyūshū Line

Adjacent stations

|-
|colspan=5 style="text-align:center;" |Matsuura Railway

Station layout
The station is ground level with 2 platforms and 3 tracks.

Environs
National Route 204
Matsuura Bus Center (Saihi Motor)
Matsuura City Office
Matsuura High School
Matsuura Municipal Matsuura Junior High School
Best Denki Matsuura-Shisa Branch

History
1 October 1959 - This station is renamed to present name.
1 April 1987 - Railways privatize and this station is inherited by JR Kyushu.
1 April 1988 - This station is inherited by Matsuura Railway.

References
「国鉄全線各駅停車 10 九州720駅」(Shogakukan, 1983) 
Nagasaki statistical yearbook (Nagasaki prefectural office statistics section,Japanese)

External links
Matsuura Railway (Japanese)
The introduction of Matsuura Station (Nagasaki Shimbun-sha,Japanese)

Railway stations in Japan opened in 1933
Railway stations in Nagasaki Prefecture